Glenmore may refer to:

Australia
Glenmore, Queensland, a suburban district of Rockhampton, Queensland
Glenmore Homestead, Rockhampton, an historic property near Rockhampton, Queensland
Glenmore, Victoria
Glenmore Park, New South Wales
Glenmore, Mulgoa, an historic property in the suburb of Mulgoa, New South Wales

Canada
 Glenmore, British Columbia, a suburban district of the city of Kelowna, British Columbia
 Glenmore Reservoir of the city of Calgary, Alberta

Indonesia
 Glenmore, Indonesia, a district in Banyuwangi Regency, East Java Province

Ireland
 Glenmore, a small council estate in South Dublin adjacent to Whitechurch, County Dublin
 Glenmore, a rural valley in County Louth
 Glenmore, County Kilkenny, a village in County Kilkenny

Scotland
 Glenmore Forest Park, Scotland
 Glenmore, Skye, a small settlement near Mugeary

South Africa
 Glenmore, a neighbourhood of the greater Berea area of Durban
 Glenmore Beach, a seaside village in KwaZulu-Natal

United States
 Glenmore, New Jersey, unincorporated community
 Glenmore, Ohio, unincorporated community
 Glenmore, Wisconsin, a town
 Glenmore, Albemarle County, Virginia, a village in Virginia
 Glenmore, Buckingham County, Virginia, a village in Virginia
 Glenmore (community), Wisconsin, an unincorporated community
 Glenmore Township LaMoure County, North Dakota
 Glenmore (Jefferson City, Tennessee), a house listed on the National Register of Historic Places
 Glenmore (Arlington, Virginia), a house recognized as a historic district 
 Glenmore Distillery Company, Owensboro, Kentucky